These are the team rosters of the nations that participated in the men's ice hockey tournament of the 2006 Winter Olympics. Each team was permitted a roster of 20 skaters and three goaltenders.

Participating teams

Canada
The following is the Canadian roster for the men's ice hockey tournament at the 2006 Winter Olympics.

Head coach: Pat Quinn

Assistant coaches: Wayne Fleming, Marc Habscheid, Ken Hitchcock, Jacques Martin

Defencemen Scott Niedermayer and Ed Jovanovski were originally selected, but due to injuries were replaced by Jay Bouwmeester and Bryan McCabe, respectively. Dan Boyle took McCabe's previous spot as a reserve. Defenceman Dan Boyle and forwards Jason Spezza and Eric Staal were selected as "reserves" in case of injury before the tournament began.

Czech Republic
The following is the Czech roster for the men's ice hockey tournament at the 2006 Winter Olympics.

Head coach: Alois Hadamczik

Assistant coaches: Mojmír Trličík, Ondrej Weissmann

Finland
The following is the Finnish roster for the men's ice hockey tournament at the 2006 Winter Olympics.

Head coach: Erkka Westerlund

Assistant coaches: Risto Dufva, Hannu Virta

Germany
The following is the German roster for the men's ice hockey tournament at the 2006 Winter Olympics.

Head coach: Uwe Krupp

Assistant coach: Ernst Höfner

Italy
The following is the Italian roster for the men's ice hockey tournament at the 2006 Winter Olympics.

Head coach:  Michel Goulet

Assistant coaches:  Ron Ivany, Fabio Polloni

Kazakhstan 
The following is the Kazakh roster for the men's ice hockey tournament at the 2006 Winter Olympics.

Head coach: Nikolai Myshagin

Assistant coach:  Gennadi Tsygurov

 1 Andrei Savenkov replaced Evgeni Blokhin on the team roster after the first two games of the tournament.

Latvia 
The following is the Latvian roster for the men's ice hockey tournament at the 2006 Winter Olympics.

Head coach: Leonīds Beresņevs

Assistant coach: Harijs Vītoliņš, Oļegs Znaroks

Russia
The following is the Russian roster for the men's ice hockey tournament at the 2006 Winter Olympics.

Head coach: Vladimir Krikunov

Assistant coaches: Vladimir Yurzinov, Sergei Nemchinov, Boris Mikhailov

Forwards Alexander Frolov and Alexander Korolyuk were replaced due to injuries by Andrei Taratukhin and Ivan Nepryaev, respectively.

Slovakia
The following is the Slovak roster for the men's ice hockey tournament at the 2006 Winter Olympics.

Head coach: František Hossa

Assistant coaches: Jerguš Bača, Lubomir Pokovic, Róbert Švehla

Sweden
The following is the Swedish roster for the men's ice hockey tournament at the 2006 Winter Olympics.

Head coach: Bengt-Åke Gustafsson

Assistant coaches: Anders Eldebrink, Janne Karlsson

Forward Markus Näslund was initially selected, but due to a groin injury he was replaced by Tomas Holmstrom

Switzerland
The following is the Swiss roster for the men's ice hockey tournament at the 2006 Winter Olympics.

Head coach: / Ralph Krueger

Assistant coaches: Jakob Kölliker,  Peter John Lee

1 Andres Ambühl replaced Thomas Ziegler on the team roster after the first five games of the tournament.

United States
The following is the American roster for the men's ice hockey tournament at the 2006 Winter Olympics.

Head coach: Peter Laviolette

Assistant Coaches: Keith Allain, Mike Sullivan

See also
 Ice hockey at the 2006 Winter Olympics rosters (women)

References

roster
2006